Hisham Al-Sharaf Rashad (born 2 April 1960) is a Kuwaiti judoka. He competed in the men's half-middleweight event at the 1988 Summer Olympics.

References

External links
 

1960 births
Living people
Kuwaiti male judoka
Olympic judoka of Kuwait
Judoka at the 1988 Summer Olympics
Place of birth missing (living people)
Asian Games medalists in judo
Judoka at the 1986 Asian Games
Asian Games bronze medalists for Kuwait
Medalists at the 1986 Asian Games